The following is a list of notable deaths in February 2019.

Entries for each day are listed alphabetically by surname. A typical entry lists information in the following sequence:
 Name, age, country of citizenship at birth, subsequent country of citizenship (if applicable), reason for notability, cause of death (if known), and reference.

February 2019

1
Kinryū Arimoto, 78, Japanese voice actor (City Hunter, Gasaraki, One Piece), esophageal cancer.
Conway Berners-Lee, 97, English mathematician and computer scientist.
D. J. Conway, 79, American occult writer.
John J. Duffy Jr., 85, American criminal defense attorney.
Alice Dye, 91, American amateur golfer and golf course designer (TPC at Sawgrass).
Tim Elkington, 98, British Royal Air Force fighter pilot, member of The Few, fall.
Jeremy Hardy, 57, English comedian, radio host and panelist (The News Quiz, I'm Sorry I Haven't a Clue, Jeremy Hardy Speaks to the Nation), cancer.
Glen Ray Hines, 75, American football player (Arkansas Razorbacks, Houston Oilers, New Orleans Saints).
Ursula Karusseit, 79, German actress (Ways across the Country, KLK Calling PTZ – The Red Orchestra).
Andrew McGahan, 52, Australian author (Praise, The White Earth, Wonders of a Godless World), pancreatic cancer.
Ayub Ogada, 63, Kenyan musician.
Edit Perényi-Weckinger, 95, Hungarian gymnast, Olympic silver medalist (1948, 1952).
Mel Pickings, 92, Canadian politician, member of the Nova Scotia House of Assembly (1978–1988).
Ehsan-ul-Haq Piracha, Pakistani politician, Minister of Finance (1988–1990).
Raymond Ratzlaff, 87, Canadian politician.
Lisa Seagram, 82, American actress (A House Is Not a Home, Caprice, The Beverly Hillbillies), dementia.
Rex Sorensen, 73, American media executive.
Yosef Sorinov, 72, Israeli footballer (Maccabi Netanya, Beitar Jerusalem, national team).
Clive Swift, 82, English actor (The National Health, Keeping Up Appearances, A Passage to India) and songwriter.
Les Thornton, 84, British professional wrestler (Stampede, NWA, WWF).
Thuppettan, 89, Indian Malayalam playwright.
Neville Watt, 88, Australian rugby league player (Balmain Tigers).
Doug Wendt, 91, Australian footballer.
Wade Wilson, 60, American football player (Minnesota Vikings, Oakland Raiders) and coach (Chicago Bears), heart attack.

2
Catherine Burns, 73, American actress (Last Summer, Me, Natalie, Red Sky at Morning), complications from a fall and cirrhosis.
Sean Cronin, 60, American meteorologist and politician.
Arunendu Das, 81, Indian musician.
William Davis, 85, German-born British journalist (BBC).
Walter James Edyvean, 80, American Roman Catholic prelate, Auxiliary Bishop of Boston (2001–2014).
Carol Emshwiller, 97, American author (The Mount).
Michael Ferguson, 60, Canadian civil servant, Auditor General (since 2011), cancer.
Michelle King, 57, American educator, cancer.
Libby Komaiko, 69, American dancer, pneumonia.
Arman Loni, 35, Pakistani politician, PTM leader, blunt force trauma.
Alaa Mashzoub, 50, Iraqi novelist and writer, expert on the History of the Jews in Iraq, shot.
Slobodan Peladić, 57, Serbian artist.
Irene Krugman Rudnick, 89, American politician, member of the South Carolina House of Representatives (1972–1976, 1981–1984, 1987–1994).
Clarence Servold, 91, Canadian cross-country skier.
Bill Sims, 69, American blues pianist.
William Slater, 78, Canadian Olympic swimmer.
Special Tiara, 11, Irish racehorse, euthanized.

3
Shukri Abrahams, 50, South African cricketer (Eastern Province).
Julie Adams, 92, American actress (Creature from the Black Lagoon, Bend of the River, Murder, She Wrote).
Renato Giuseppe Bosisio, 88–89, Italian-born Canadian academic.
Novak Bošković, 29, Serbian handball player, suicide by gunshot.
Glenn Brady, 83, American football coach (Chadron State Eagles, Milwaukee Panthers, Sacramento State Hornets).
Irv Brown, 83, American basketball referee and sportscaster.
Jeetendra Singh Bundela, 60, Indian politician.
Wallace Chafe, 91, American linguist.
Detsl, 35, Russian hip hop artist, heart attack.
Carmen Duncan, 76, Australian actress (Harlequin, Another World, Turkey Shoot), cancer.
Bob Friend, 88, American baseball player (Pittsburgh Pirates, New York Mets, New York Yankees).
Richard Lacey, 78, British microbiologist.
Irving Lavin, 91, American art historian.
Emily Levine, 73, American humorist, lung cancer.
Tapan Mitra, 70, Indian-born American economist.
Stephen Negoesco, 93, Romanian-American Hall of Fame soccer player and manager.
Jüri Pihl, 64, Estonian politician, Minister of the Interior (2007–2009).
Peter Posa, 77, New Zealand guitarist.
Ruan Xueyu, 86, Chinese engineer.
John Sinclair, 79, Australian conservationist.
Barbra Casbar Siperstein, 76, American lawyer and LGBT activist.
Kristoff St. John, 52, American actor (The Young and the Restless, The Champ, Generations), hypertrophic heart disease.
Joe P. Tolson, 77, American politician, member of the North Carolina House of Representatives (1997–2014), respiratory failure.
Danny Williams, 94, English football player (Rotherham United) and manager (Swindon Town, Sheffield Wednesday).
Zhang Yumao, 83, Chinese literary scholar and politician, Vice Mayor of Shenyang, Vice Chairman of the China Democratic League.

4
Giampiero Artegiani, 63, Italian singer-songwriter.
Colin Barker, 79, British sociologist and historian.
Ramesh Bhatkar, 70, Indian actor (Maherchi Sadi), cancer.
Nita Bieber, 92, American actress (Rhythm and Weep, Millie's Daughter, The Prince Who Was a Thief).
Yuri Bosco, 88, Russian artist.
Matt Brazier, 42, English footballer (QPR, Cardiff City, Leyton Orient), non-Hodgkin follicular lymphoma.
Bunny Brown, 60s, Jamaican reggae musician, bone cancer.
Isacio Calleja, 82, Spanish footballer (Atlético de Madrid, national team).
Awlad Hossain Chakladar, 68, Bangladeshi film producer and director.
Sandrine Doucet, 59, French politician, Deputy (2012–2017), cancer.
Kermit Eady, 79, American community activist.
Fang Fukang, 83, Chinese physicist, President of Beijing Normal University (1989–1995).
Naji Keyrouz, 58, Lebanese Olympic judoka (1980).
Gary LaPierre, 76, American radio journalist (WBZ), leukemia.
Bernard Lietaer, 76, Belgian engineer and economist.
John Otho Marsh Jr., 92, American politician, member of the U.S. House of Representatives from Virginia's 7th district (1963–1971), Secretary of the Army (1981–1989), heart failure.
Leu Mazurkevich, 79, Belarusian football player and manager (BATE Borisov).
Harold Mendelsohn, 95, American sociologist.
Bruno Messerli, 87, Swiss geographer.
Matti Nykänen, 55, Finnish singer and ski jumper, Olympic champion (1984, 1988), pancreatitis and pneumonia.
Leonie Ossowski, 93, German writer (Zwei Mütter).
Vyacheslav Ovchinnikov, 82, Russian composer.
Karen Randers-Pehrson, 86, Norwegian actress (Barn av solen).
John Rone, 69, American stage actor and director.
Véronique Schiltz, 76, French historian.
Ove Kristian Sundberg, 86, Norwegian church musician, composer and musicologist.
Mohamed Ofei Sylla, 44, Guinean footballer (Gaziantepspor, Denizlispor, national team).
Zbigniew Szczepkowski, 66, Polish Olympic cyclist (1976).
Ward Thomas, 95, British television executive and World War II fighter pilot.
Izzy Young, 90, American-Swedish folklorist and author.

5
André Boudrias, 75, Canadian ice hockey player (Vancouver Canucks, Montreal Canadiens, Minnesota North Stars).
Audrey Cleary, 88, American politician, member of the North Dakota House of Representatives (1999–2002).
Joe Fascione, 74, Scottish footballer (Chelsea, Dundee United).
Kathleen Fraser, 83, American poet.
Eddy Giles, 80, American R&B and blues singer-songwriter and musician.
Jean Herskovits, 83, American historian.
Peter Hughes, 96, English actor (The Great Muppet Caper, Hope and Glory, Evita), pneumonia.
Christine Kay, 54, American journalist and editor (The New York Times, Newsday, Pittsburgh Press), breast cancer.
Syed Badr-ul Hasan Khan Bahadur, Indian actor (The Sword of Tipu Sultan, Mann, Jodhaa Akbar) and dancer.
Garr King, 83, American judge, Senior Judge of the United States District Court for the District of Oregon (since 2009).
George Klein, 83, American disc jockey (WLFP) and TV host (Talent Party), complications from dementia.
Tapio Lehto, 88, Finnish Olympic triple jumper.
Ian McDonald, 95, Australian cricketer (Victoria).
Andy Nisbet, 65, Scottish climber, fall.
Pericles Panagopoulos, 83, Greek shipping magnate.
Joe Presko, 90, American baseball player (St. Louis Cardinals, Detroit Tigers).
Manasa Qoro, 54, Fijian rugby union player (national team).
Miriam Rivera, 38, Mexican reality show personality (There's Something About Miriam, Big Brother Australia 2004).
Anne Firor Scott, 97, American historian.
Edward H. Simpson, 96, British statistician and civil servant.
Ladu Kishore Swain, 71, Indian politician, member of the Lok Sabha (since 2014), kidney disease.
Doc Thompson, 49, American radio personality, hit by train.
Mel Tomlinson, 65, American dancer and choreographer.
Václav Vorlíček, 88, Czech film director (Who Wants to Kill Jessie?, The End of Agent W4C, The Girl on the Broomstick).
Guy Webster, 79, American celebrity photographer (The Doors, The Beach Boys, The Rolling Stones), complications from diabetes and liver cancer.
Vano Zodelava, 61, Georgian politician, Mayor of Tbilisi (1998–2004), injuries from a traffic collision.

6
Rudi Assauer, 74, German football player (Borussia Dortmund, Werder Bremen) and manager (Schalke 04), complications from Alzheimer's disease.
Edwin Barnes, 84, British Roman Catholic priest (since 2011) and former Anglican prelate, Bishop of Richborough (1995–2002).
David Beaird, 66, American screenwriter and director (My Chauffeur, Scorchers).
Dick Blok, 94, Dutch medievalist.
Gizella Bodnár, 92, Hungarian serial burglar.
Edward Burn, 96, British legal scholar.
Tom Cade, 91, American ornithologist.
John Cocks, 52, New Zealand builder and television personality (My House My Castle), kidney cancer.
Paul Dewar, 56, Canadian politician, MP (2006–2015), glioblastoma.
Jairo do Nascimento, 72, Brazilian footballer (Corinthians, Coritiba), kidney cancer.
Yechiel Eckstein, 67, Israeli-American rabbi, founder of International Fellowship of Christians and Jews, heart attack.
Manfred Eigen, 91, German biophysical chemist, Nobel Prize laureate (1967).
Gerald English, 93, British tenor.
Marcia Falkender, Baroness Falkender, 86, British politician.
Fang Renqiu, 89, Chinese football player and coach (national team).
Michael Green, 88, British theologian.
Todor Kavaldzhiev, 85, Bulgarian politician, Vice President (1997–2002).
Vikki Orvice, 56, British sports journalist, breast cancer.
Rosamunde Pilcher, 94, British author (The Shell Seekers), stroke.
Mags Portman, 44, British physician, advocate for PrEP in fight against HIV, mesothelioma.
Richard Schwartz, 76, American bridge player.
A. S. M. Shahjahan, 78, Bangladeshi officer, Inspector General of Police (1992–1996), complications from Parkinson's disease.
Lonnie Simmons, 74, American record producer, founder of Total Experience Records.
Ye Qingyao, 91, Taiwanese-born Chinese engineer and politician, Vice Chairman of the Fujian CPPCC.
Tilly van der Zwaard, 81, Dutch Olympic athlete (1964, 1968).

7
Chavara Parukutty Amma, 75, Indian dancer and teacher.
Miriam Argüello, 91, Nicaraguan politician, President of the National Assembly (1990–2012).
Robert Ashby, 79, British actor.
John Tyler Bonner, 98, American biologist.
John Dingell, 92, American politician, member of the U.S. House of Representatives (1955–2015), prostate cancer.
Albert Finney, 82, English actor (Tom Jones, The Gathering Storm, Big Fish), BAFTA winner (1961), chest infection.
Satoshi Hiyamizu, 75, Japanese electrical engineer.
James Jackson Hough, 73, American businessman and philanthropist, shot.
Per Olov Jansson, 98, Finnish photographer.
Al Johnson, 83, Canadian ice hockey player (Montreal Canadiens, Detroit Red Wings).
Alfred Lecerf, 70, Belgian politician, Mayor of Lontzen (1994–2018) and member of the Parliament of the German-speaking Community (1978–1981).
Mable Lee, 97, American tap dancer.
Legarda, 29, Colombian singer.
Rocky Lockridge, 60, American boxer, WBA super featherweight champion (1984–1985), complications from a stroke.
Heidi Mohr, 51, German footballer (TuS Niederkirchen, TuS Ahrbach, national team), cancer.
Arthur Murphy, 90, Irish broadcaster (Mailbag).
Caroline Mwatha, 37, Kenyan human rights activist, bleeding from ruptured uterus after unsafe abortion.
Randy Nauert, 74, American surf rock musician (The Bel-Airs, The Challengers), heart attack.
Jan Olszewski, 88, Polish politician, Prime Minister (1991–1992).
Frank Robinson, 83, American Hall of Fame baseball player (Cincinnati Reds, Baltimore Orioles) and manager (Cleveland Indians), bone cancer.
Jörg Schönbohm, 81, German military officer and politician, Inspector of the Army (1991–1992) and Deputy Minister President of Brandenburg (1999–2009).
Bill Spence, 78, American hammered dulcimer player.
Edward Zigler, 88, American psychologist.

8
Rune Åhlund, 88, Swedish Olympic long-distance runner.
Mahesh Anand, 57, Indian actor (Karishmaa, Lahu Ke Do Rang).
Seweryn Bialer, 92, German-born American political scientist.
Frankie Byrne, 94, Irish Gaelic footballer (Meath).
Fernando Clavijo, 63, Uruguayan-born American soccer player (San Diego Sockers, national team) and manager (Colorado Rapids), multiple myeloma.
Zbigniew Czajkowski, 98, Polish fencing coach.
Sharif Fayez, 73, Afghan academic and politician, Minister of Higher Education (2001–2007), heart attack.
Georg Gerster, 90, Swiss journalist and aerial photographer.
Knut Haavik, 75, Norwegian journalist and editor (Se og Hør).
Dick Kempthorn, 92, American football player (Michigan Wolverines) and businessman.
Angel Koritarov, 77, Bulgarian Olympic volleyball player (1964, 1968).
Jacques Labertonnière, 92, French racing cyclist.
Bert McKasy, 77, American politician, member of the Minnesota House of Representatives (1983–1988).
Jim Miller, 76, Scottish linguist.
Harald Motzki, 70, Dutch Islam scholar.
Walter Munk, 101, Austrian-born American oceanographer, member of the Navy Electronics Laboratory.
Cliff Myers, 72, English footballer (Charlton Athletic, Yeovil Town, Torquay United).
Anilkumar Patel, 73, Indian politician, prostate cancer.
Wolfgang Rindler, 94, Austrian-born American physicist, (Event Horizon, Rindler coordinates).
Gary Robinson, 70, Canadian football player (BC Lions). (death announced on this date)
Hanno Rumpf, 60, Namibian politician and diplomat, Ambassador to Germany (2003–2006).
Robert Ryman, 88, American painter.
Kurt Sommerlatt, 90, German football player (Karlsruher SC, Bayern Munich) and manager (Borussia Neunkirchen).
Vishnu Wagh, 53, Indian writer.
Sergei Yursky, 83, Russian actor (Time, Forward!, The Golden Calf, The Meeting Place Cannot Be Changed).

9
Salvatore Bellomo, 67, Belgian professional wrestler (ASW, WWF, ECW), cancer.
Bentong, 55, Filipino comedian, actor and television host, cardiac arrest.
Satyajit Biswas, 37, Indian politician, shot.
Cadet, 28, British rapper, traffic collision.
Jerry Casale, 85, American baseball player (Boston Red Sox, Detroit Tigers).
Dan Cashman, 85, American actor.
Barney Cooney, 84, Australian politician, Senator (1984–2002).
Siamion Domash, 69, Belarusian politician, heart attack.
Farhad Ebrahimi, 83, Iranian poet and writer.
Mario Gerla, 75, Italian computer scientist, pancreatic cancer.
Niki Goulandris, 94, Greek philanthropist and painter.
Aina Moll Marquès, 88, Spanish philologist of Catalan language and politician.
Ana Nisi Goyco, 68, Puerto Rican beauty queen and politician, member of the Senate (1980–1992).
Huang Erh-hsuan, 82, Taiwanese politician, MLY (1993–2002).
Nicholas Kafoglis, 89, American politician, member of the Kentucky House of Representatives (1972–1976) and Senate (1988–1998), complications from broken hip.
Mick Kennedy, 57, Irish footballer (Portsmouth, Stoke City, Halifax Town).
Katharina Lindner, 39, German-born Scottish footballer (Glasgow City).
Shelley Lubben, 50, American adult film actress and anti-pornography activist.
Ron W. Miller, 85, American businessman and football player (Los Angeles Rams), President and CEO of The Walt Disney Company (1978–1984), heart failure.
Fred Pickering, 78, English footballer (Blackburn Rovers, Everton, national team).
Maximilian Reinelt, 30, German rower, Olympic champion (2012) and silver medalist (2016), heart attack.
Ian Ross, 72, Scottish footballer (Liverpool, Aston Villa, Peterborough United).
Junya Sato, 86, Japanese film director (Kimi yo Fundo no Kawa o Watare, Ningen no Shōmei, Never Give Up).
Tomi Ungerer, 87, French book illustrator (The Three Robbers, Flat Stanley), cartoonist and film poster designer (Dr. Strangelove).
Patricia Nell Warren, 82, American author (The Front Runner).
Milt Welch, 94, American baseball player (Detroit Tigers).
Phil Western, 47, Canadian electronic musician (Download, PlatEAU).
Bruce Williams, 86, American Hall of Fame radio host (WCTC, WMCA).
Robert Winter, 94, American architectural historian.
Neville Young, 78, New Zealand lawyer, president of the New Zealand National Party (1986–1989).

10
Bethel Nnaemeka Amadi, 54, Nigerian politician, President of the Pan-African Parliament (2012–2015).
Carmen Argenziano, 75, American actor (Stargate SG-1, Booker, Angels & Demons).
Jogesh Chandra Barman, 69, Indian politician.
Virginia Walcott Beauchamp, 98, American educator.
Mario Bernardo, 99, Italian cinematographer (Love and Troubles, Love Meetings, The Hawks and the Sparrows) and Resistance fighter.
Miranda Bonansea, 92, Italian actress (Hands Off Me!) and voice actress.
Babette Brown, 87, South African writer.
Red Cashion, 87, American football official (NFL).
Terry Dempsey, 77, English-born South African songwriter, struck by gyrocopter.  
Juanjo Domínguez, 67, Argentine classical guitarist.
Eric Dunning, 82, British sociologist.
David Ejoor, 87, Nigerian military officer, Chief of Army Staff (1971–1975).
Heinz Fütterer, 87, German sprinter, Olympic bronze medalist (1956).
Robert Ghanem, 76, Lebanese politician, MP (1992–2018).
Dinualdo Gutierrez, 79, Filipino Roman Catholic prelate, Bishop of Marbel (1981–2018).
Walter B. Jones Jr., 76, American politician, member of the U.S. House of Representatives (since 1995), amyotrophic lateral sclerosis.
Kōji Kitao, 55, Japanese sumo and professional wrestler (AWA, NJPW).
Sam McCready, 82, Northern Irish actor, playwright and theatre director.
Roderick MacFarquhar, 88, British politician, journalist and historian, MP (1970–1978).
Nicolas M. Mondejar, 94, Filipino Roman Catholic prelate, Bishop of Romblon (1974–1987) and San Carlos (1987–2001).
Fernando Peres, 76, Portuguese football player (Sporting CP, national team) and manager (Sanjoanense).
Daniel Silva dos Santos, 36, Brazilian footballer, cancer.
Maura Viceconte, 51, Italian Olympic long-distance runner (1996, 2000), suicide by hanging.
Jan-Michael Vincent, 73, American actor (Airwolf, The Mechanic, Big Wednesday), heart attack.
Michael Wilson, 81, Canadian politician and diplomat, Ambassador to the United States (2006–2009), cancer.
Jackie Young, 84, American politician, member of the Hawaii House of Representatives (1990–1994).

11
Ben Abell, 86, American meteorologist.
Alix, Princess of Ligne, 89, Luxembourg royal.
Vijaya Bapineedu, 82, Indian film director (Gang Leader, Big Boss, Family), complications from Alzheimer's disease.
Nora Bennis, 78, Irish political activist.
Ricardo Boechat, 66, Argentine-born Brazilian journalist (O Globo, O Dia, Jornal do Brasil), helicopter crash.
Winslow Briggs, 90, American plant biologist.
James Burns, 89, Canadian executive.
Jack Crimian, 92, American baseball player (St. Louis Cardinals, Kansas City Athletics, Detroit Tigers).
Abelardo Escobar Prieto, 81, Mexican politician, Secretary of Agrarian Reform (2006-2012) and Deputy (2000-2003), kidney failure.
Réal Giguère, 85, Canadian television host.
He Bingsong, 87, Chinese legal scholar.
Ivan Irwin, 91, American-born Canadian ice hockey player (New York Rangers, Montreal Canadiens).
Jeffrey Miles, 83, Australian jurist, Chief Justice of the Australian Capital Territory (1985–2002).
Sibghatullah Mojaddedi, 93, Afghan politician, Acting President (1992).
Taiwo Ogunjobi, 65, Nigerian football player (Shooting Stars, national team) and administrator.
Delroy Poyser, 57, Jamaican long jumper, CAC champion (1982), cancer.
Eulade Rudahunga, 97, Rwandan Roman Catholic priest.
Harvey Scales, 78, American soul singer and songwriter ("Disco Lady", "Love-Itis"), kidney failure and pneumonia.
Joe Schlesinger, 90, Canadian journalist (CBC News).
Armida Siguion-Reyna, 88, Filipino actress, singer and television host, cancer.
Lou Sossamon, 97, American football player (South Carolina Gamecocks, New York Yankees).
Allan Wild, 91, New Zealand architect and academic (University of Auckland).

12
Betty Ballantine, 99, British-born American book publisher (Ballantine Books, Bantam Books).
Gordon Banks, 81, English footballer (Leicester City, Stoke City, national team), world champion (1966).
Rolf Böhme, 84, German politician, Deputy (1972–1982) and Mayor of Freiburg (1982–2002).
Christoph Broelsch, 74, German surgeon.
Cheng Zhiqing, 84, Chinese chemist and politician, Vice Chairwoman of the Revolutionary Committee of the Chinese Kuomintang.
Jean E. Fairfax, 98, American educator.
Bashir-ud-din Farooqi, 85, Grand Mufti of Jammu and Kashmir.
David Forden, 88, American intelligence officer (CIA), complications from Alzheimer's disease.
W. E. B. Griffin, 89, American writer (Brotherhood of War, The Corps, Badge of Honor), cancer.
George Grindley, 93, New Zealand geologist.
Altay Hajiyev, 87, Azerbaijani painter.
George Irish, 76, Montserratian academic, musician and writer.
Georg Jann, 85, German organ builder.
Afsir Karim, 85, Indian army general and author.
Ferenc Keserű, 72, Hungarian Olympic cyclist (1968).
Godzilla, 31, Tanzanian rapper.
Lyndon LaRouche, 96, American political activist, founder of the LaRouche movement.
Olli Lindholm, 54, Finnish singer and guitarist (Appendix, Yö), seizure.
Suresh Luthra, 74, Indian cricketer (Delhi).
Pedro Morales, 76, Puerto Rican Hall of Fame professional wrestler (WWA, WWWF) and commentator (WWF Superstars), complications from Parkinson's disease.
Austin Rhodes, 81, English rugby league player (St Helens, Leigh) and coach (Swinton).
Bisi Silva, 56, Nigerian art curator, cancer.
Marisa Solinas, 79, Italian singer and actress (Boccaccio '70, La commare secca, Almost Blue).
Lucjan Trela, 76, Polish Olympic boxer (1968).
David Walton, 73, British ecologist.
Harry Hon Hai Wong, 96, Chinese entrepreneur.
Zhan Ziqing, 81, Chinese historian, Vice President of Northeast Normal University.

13
Idriz Ajeti, 101, Kosovar Albanologist.
Julius Beinortas, 76, Lithuanian politician.
Mohan Singh Bundela, 74, Indian politician.
Paul Cain, 89, American Pentecostal minister, pneumonia.
Greg Alyn Carlson, 47, American criminal, shot.
Jack Coghill, 93, American politician, member of the Alaska House of Representatives (1953–1955, 1957–1959) and Senate (1959–1965, 1985–1990), Lieutenant Governor (1990–1994).
Bibi Ferreira, 96, Brazilian actress (Leonora of the Seven Seas, The End of the River) and singer.
Eric Harrison, 81, English football player (Halifax Town) and coach (Manchester United).
Edith Iglauer, 101, American writer.
Connie Jones, 84, American jazz trumpeter.
Vitaliy Khmelnytskyi, 75, Ukrainian football player (Dynamo Kyiv, USSR national team) and manager (Granit Cherkasy).
Christopher Knopf, 91, American screenwriter and union executive, president of WGA and IAWG, heart failure.
Miroslav Kusý, 87, Slovak political scientist, heart failure.
Helene Machado, 92, American baseball player (Peoria Redwings, Fort Wayne Daisies).
Dick Manville, 93, American baseball player (Boston Braves, Chicago Cubs).
Baqar Naqvi, 83, Pakistani Urdu poet and translator.
Callistus Ndlovu, 83, Zimbabwean academic and politician, pancreatic cancer.
Joyce Anne Noel, 86, American beauty queen, Miss Rhode Island (1953), Miss Rhode Island USA (1954), First Lady of Rhode Island (1973–1977).
Ray Price, 88, American speechwriter (Richard Nixon, Gerald Ford), stroke.
Anne Loreille Saunders, 88, British historian.
Arif Şirin, 69, Turkish singer and composer, throat cancer.
Hans Stadlmair, 89, Austrian conductor.
Jörg Streli, 78, Austrian architect.
Dezső Tandori, 80, Hungarian poet and writer.
Jimmy Turman, 91, American politician, member (1955–1963) and Speaker (1961–1963) of the Texas House of Representatives, stroke.
Ted Tsukiyama, 98, American attorney and bonsai enthusiast.
Zhang Li, 67, Chinese table tennis player, lung cancer.

14
Michel Bernard, 87, French Olympic middle- and long-distance runner (1960, 1964).
Sir David Collins, 69, British educator.
Francis D'Souza, 64, Indian politician, Deputy Chief Minister of Goa (2012–2017) and MLA (since 1999), cancer.
Tommy Giordano, 93, American baseball player (Philadelphia Athletics) and scout (Baltimore Orioles), blood infection.
John Hanscomb, 94, British politician, Mayor of Bolton (1982–1983).
John Hellawell, 75, English footballer (Bradford City).
Tokitsunada Hironori, 49, Japanese sumo wrestler, heart failure.
David Horowitz, 81, American consumer reporter and journalist (Fight Back! with David Horowitz).
Barrie Hutchinson, 92, New Zealand water polo player, British Empire Games silver medalist (1950), rugby union player (Wellington, Auckland).
Kao Chun-ming, 89, Taiwanese Presbyterian minister and political prisoner.
Rocky Krsnich, 91, American baseball player (Chicago White Sox).
Kwong Hon-sang, 80, Hong Kong engineer and civil servant, Secretary for Works (1995–1999).
Andrea Levy, 62, English author (Small Island, The Long Song), cancer.
Simon P. Norton, 66, English mathematician, heart disease.
Michael Nudelman, 80, Israeli politician, member of the Knesset (1996–2009).
Neil Papiano, 85, American lawyer.
Alfred Radley, 94, British fashion designer.
Clinton Wheeler, 59, American basketball player (Bayer Giants Leverkusen, Indiana Pacers).
Sergei Zakharov, 68, Russian singer, heart failure.

15
Sal Artiaga, 72, American baseball executive, President of Minor League Baseball (1988–1991).
Ellis Avery, 46, American writer (The Teahouse Fire), leiomyosarcoma.
Thomas Bruice, 93, American biochemist, complications from a stroke.
Kofi Burbridge, 57, American rock multi-instrumentalist (Tedeschi Trucks Band, The Derek Trucks Band, Aquarium Rescue Unit), heart attack.
Efrain Chacurian, 94, Argentine-born American soccer player (Racing Club, Bridgeport Vasco da Gama, national team).
Terry Charman, 68, English military historian and museum curator (Imperial War Museum), cancer.
Erminie Cohen, 92, Canadian politician, Senator (1993–2001).
Thomas Joseph Costello, 89, American Roman Catholic prelate, Auxiliary Bishop of Syracuse (1978–2004).
Pence Dacus, 87, American football player (Texas State Bobcats) and coach (Pepperdine Waves).
Siegfried Engelmann, 87, American educationist, co-developer of Direct Instruction.
Sir Charles Farr, 59, British civil servant, Chair of Joint Intelligence Committee (since 2015), cancer.
Jens Feder, 80, Norwegian physicist.
Antonio César Fernández, 72, Spanish Salesian missionary, shot.
Sara Gizaw, 90, Ethiopian aristocrat.
Ragnar Halvorsen, 94, Norwegian businessman and union leader, Chairman of the Export Council (1987–1992).
Shamil Isayev, 54, Russian footballer (Uralan Elista, Tavriya Simferopol, Spartak Vladikavkaz).
Gene Littler, 88, American Hall of Fame professional golfer, U.S. Open winner (1961).
Al Mahmud, 82, Bangladeshi poet and novelist, pneumonia.
Zlatica Mijatović, 96, Serbian Olympic gymnast (1948).
Adriano Ossicini, 98, Italian politician, Senator (1968–1992, 1996–2001) and Minister for Family (1995–1996), complications from a fall.
Mohamed Purnomo, 57, Indonesian Olympic sprinter (1984), cancer.
Lee Radziwill, 85, American socialite.
Erika Simon, 91, German archaeologist.
Dave Smith, 78, American archivist (Walt Disney).
John Stalker, 79, British police officer, Deputy Chief Constable of Greater Manchester Police (1984–1987).
J. Mary Taylor, 87, American mammalogist.
Mikhail Yuryev, 59, Russian politician, Member of the Duma (1996–1999).

16
Sam Bass, 57, American motorsports artist, sepsis.
Don Bragg, 83, American pole vaulter, Olympic champion (1960), complications from Parkinson's disease.
Patrick Caddell, 68, American pollster, complications from a stroke.
Fang Huai, 101, Chinese military officer, major general of PLA.
Bruno Ganz, 77, Swiss actor (Downfall, Wings of Desire, Nosferatu the Vampyre), colorectal cancer.
Richard N. Gardner, 91, American diplomat, Ambassador to Italy (1977–1981) and Spain and Andorra (1993–1997).
Gu Linfang, 90, Chinese police official and politician, Secretary-General of the Central Political and Legal Affairs Commission and Vice Minister of Public Security.
Jeffrey Hart, 88, American cultural critic.
Michael Killisch-Horn, 78, Austrian politician, announcer and skier, MP (1986–1990).
Juan Incháustegui, 80, Peruvian engineer and politician, Minister of Energy and Mines (1984–1985) and of Industry, Foreign Trade and Tourism (2001), Senator (1990–1992).
Thomas R. Kane, 94, American engineer.
Li Rui, 101, Chinese politician, historian and dissident, organ failure.
Albert Ludwig, 99, Canadian politician, Alberta MLA (1959–1975)
Bernie McCarthy, 75, Australian VFL footballer (North Melbourne)
Serge Merlin, 86, French actor (Amélie, The City of Lost Children).
Charles Mungoshi, 71, Zimbabwean writer, cerebral atrophy from stroke.
Ken Nordine, 98, American voice-over and recording artist (Word Jazz, Son of Word Jazz, Love Words).
Frank Pitura, 75, Canadian politician, member of the Manitoba Legislature (1995–2003).
Theodore Isaac Rubin, 95, American psychiatrist.
Shelly Saltman, 87, American sports promoter.
Silvestre Luís Scandián, 87, Brazilian Roman Catholic prelate, Bishop of Araçuaí (1975–1981) and Archbishop of Vitória (1984–2004).
Nani Soedarsono, 90, Indonesian politician, Minister of Social Welfare (1983–1988).
Kees Stoop, 89, Dutch artist.
Albert Vorspan, 95, American political activist.
Eyvind Wichmann, 90, Finnish-born American theoretical physicist.

17
Joseph Akouissone, 76, Central African filmmaker and journalist.
Monjur Ahmed Bacchu Mia, 84, Bangladeshi politician.
Eduardo Bauzá, 79, Argentine politician, Minister of Health (1989–1990) and of the Interior (1989–1990), Chief of the Cabinet of Ministers (1995–1996).
Ragnar Christiansen, 96, Norwegian politician, Minister of Finance (1971–1972), Minister of Transport (1976–1978) and County Governor of Buskerud (1979–1989).
Ethel Ennis, 86, American jazz singer, stroke.
Carlos Flores, 44, Peruvian footballer (Universitario, national team), heart attack.
Paul Flynn, 84, British politician, MP for Newport West (since 1987).
Alberto Gutman, 60, Cuban-born American politician, member of the Florida House of Representatives (1984–1992) and Senate (1992–1999).
Kálmán Györgyi, 79, Hungarian jurist and academic, Chief Prosecutor (1990–2000).
Eric P. Hamp, 98, American linguist.
Bill Jenkins, 73, American epidemiologist, complications from sarcoidosis.
Antons Justs, 87, Latvian Roman Catholic prelate, Bishop of Jelgava (1995–2011).
Ami Maayani, 83, Israeli composer, cancer.
S. M. Qureshi, 83, Pakistani academician and civil servant.
Paul Ramos, 28, Argentine footballer (Belgrano, Sport Loreto, Gimnasia y Esgrima), traffic collision.
Frederico Rosa, 61, Portuguese footballer (Boavista, Estrela Amadora, national team), amyotrophic lateral sclerosis.
Šaban Šaulić, 67, Serbian folk singer, traffic collision.
Kelly Seymour, 82, South African cricketer (Western Province, national team).
Johnny Valentine, 88, Scottish footballer (Queen's Park, Rangers, St Johnstone).

18
Thomas T. Allsen, 78–79, American historian.
Anna Borgeryd, 49, Swedish business executive (Polarbröd).
Wallace Smith Broecker, 87, American geophysicist, coined the term "global warming".
John Carlisle, 76, British politician, MP (1979–1997), heart attack.
George Cawkwell, 99, New Zealand classical scholar.
O'Neal Compton, 68, American actor (Deep Impact, Roadracers, Kill Me Later).
Kevin Conner, 92, American theologian.
T. J. Cunningham, 46, American football player (Seattle Seahawks), shot.
Stewart Dalzell, 75, American senior judge of the District Court for the Eastern District of Pennsylvania.
Charles Deblois, 79, Canadian politician, member of the House of Commons (1988–1993).
Valentina Dimitrieva, 81, Russian farm worker.
Brian Edgley, 81, English footballer (Shrewsbury Town, Cardiff City, Brentford).
Mary Ann Feldman, 85, American music critic.
Skip Groff, 70, American record producer and DJ, seizure.
Jan Hermansson, 76, Swedish aikidoka.
Pamela Huby, 96, British philosopher.
Louise Manoogian Simone, 85, American philanthropist, president of the Armenian General Benevolent Union (1989–2002).
Alessandro Mendini, 87, Italian architect and designer (Groninger Museum).
Toni Myers, 75, Canadian IMAX documentarian (Space Station 3D, Hubble, A Beautiful Planet), cancer.
Nafiu Osagie, 85, Nigerian Olympic high jumper (1952).
Jean Périsson, 94, French conductor.
Wim Richter, 72, South African chemist.
Kor Sarr, 43, Senegalese football player (Beauvais, Caen) and manager (AS Pikine).
Laura Solomon, 44, New Zealand novelist, brain cancer.
George Springer, 94, American mathematician and computer scientist.
Russell Sugarmon, 89, American judge and politician, member of the Tennessee House of Representatives (1967–1969).
John Traupman, 96, American classical scholar.
Ram Shankar Tripathi, 89, Indian Buddhist scholar.
Bob Van Der Veken, 90, Belgian actor (De Collega's).
Peter Wells, 69, New Zealand writer and filmmaker (Desperate Remedies), prostate cancer.

19
Marie-Claire Bancquart, 86, French poet and literary critic.
Dick Boushka, 84, American basketball player, Olympic gold medallist (1956).
Giulio Brogi, 83, Italian actor (Days of Fire, Morel's Invention, The Yes Man).
Clark Dimond, 77, American musician and writer.
Amir Gulistan Janjua, 95, Pakistani army officer and governor of the North-West Frontier Province.
Hu Peiquan, 98, Chinese aerospace engineer and educator.
Paul Janeczko, 73, American poet and anthologist.
Muhammad Khasru, 73, Bangladeshi journalist, complications from diabetes and pneumonia.
Alan R. King, 64, British linguist.
Karl Lagerfeld, 85, German fashion designer (Chloé, Fendi, Chanel), pancreatic cancer.
Abdoulaye Yerodia Ndombasi, 86, Congolese politician, Minister of Foreign Affairs (1999–2000) and Vice-President (2003–2006).
Don Newcombe, 92, American baseball player (Los Angeles Dodgers, Cincinnati Reds, Cleveland Indians).
João Paulo dos Reis Veloso, 87, Brazilian economist, Minister of Planning (1969–1979), president of the Institute of Applied Economic Research (1969).
Namvar Singh, 92, Indian writer.
Artie Wayne, 77, American musician, songwriter and record producer.
Ewald Weibel, 89, Swiss biologist.
Stanley Wolpert, 91, American Indologist.

20
Chelo Alonso, 85, Cuban actress (Goliath and the Barbarians, Morgan the Pirate, Run, Man, Run).
An Zuozhang, 92, Chinese historian, heart attack.
Amar Basu, 79, Indian politician. 
Dominick Argento, 91, American composer, Pulitzer Prize winner (1975).
Mark Bramble, 68, American theatre director and producer (Barnum, 42nd Street), cardiovascular hypertension.
William Broomfield, 96, American politician, member of the United States House of Representatives from Michigan's 18th and 19th districts (1957–1993).
Alma Butia, 90, Croatian Olympic sprinter (1948).
Fabien Clain, 41, French terrorist, airstrike.
Teotónio de Souza, 72, Portuguese historian.
Dimosthenis Theocharidis, 104, Greek politician.
John P. Flaherty Jr., 87, American judge, Chief Justice of the Supreme Court of Pennsylvania (1996–2001).
David P. B. Fitzpatrick, 69, Irish historian.
Fred Foster, 87, American Hall of Fame record producer ("Only the Lonely", "Oh, Pretty Woman") and songwriter ("Me and Bobby McGee").
Joe Gibbon, 83, American baseball player (Pittsburgh Pirates, San Francisco Giants, Cincinnati Reds).
Claude Goretta, 89, Swiss film director (The Invitation, La provinciale, The Death of Mario Ricci).
Kemal Karpat, 96, Turkish historian, multiple organ failure.
James W. Lance, 92, Australian neurologist.
Francisco Mañosa, 88, Filipino architect (Coconut Palace, EDSA Shrine), National Artist (2018).
Augustus Richard Norton, 72, American professor.
Michael Pereira, 86, Kenyan Olympic hockey player (1956).
Nandyala Srinivasa Reddy, 101, Indian politician.
Peter Rüchel, 81, German music journalist, founder of Rockpalast. 
Herlinda Sánchez Laurel, 77, Mexican artist.
Bruno Schroder, 86, British banker (Schroders).
Vinny Vella, 72, American actor (Casino, Ghost Dog: The Way of the Samurai, The Sopranos) and comedian, liver cancer.
Boris Vieru, 61, Moldovan politician and journalist, MP (2009–2014).
William von Raab, 77, American attorney.
Ekkehard Wlaschiha, 80, German operatic baritone, Grammy winner (1990, 1991).
Ken Young, 76, British political scientist.
Zhang Wenbin, 81, Chinese archaeologist, curator and politician, Director of the National Cultural Heritage Administration (1996–2002).

21
Gus Backus, 81, American singer (The Del-Vikings).
Brahmanapalli Balaiah, Indian politician, MLA (1978–1983), heart attack.
Rajkumar Barjatya, 75–76, Indian movie producer.
Jean-Christophe Benoît, 93, French baritone.
Bernard Berg, 87, Luxembourgian politician, Deputy Prime Minister (1976–1979).
Triny Bourkel, 91, Luxembourgian Olympic athlete (1948).
Paolo Brera, 69, Italian novelist and journalist, heart attack.
Nick Cafardo, 62, American sports journalist (The Boston Globe), embolism.
Sue Casey, 92, American actress (The Secret Life of Walter Mitty, Rear Window, American Beauty).
Maurizio Clerici, 89, Italian Olympic rower (1956).
Sequeira Costa, 89, Portuguese pianist, cancer.
Stanley Donen, 94, American film director (Singin' in the Rain, On the Town, Seven Brides for Seven Brothers), heart failure.
E Dongchen, 79, Chinese earth scientist and polar explorer.
Edward Enfield, 89, British television and radio presenter, and newspaper journalist.
Julio Fuller, 62, Costa Rican footballer (Limonense, Cartaginés, national team).
Harri Järvi, 79, Finnish footballer (HPK, national team).
Giuseppe Mifsud Bonnici, 88, Maltese magistrate, Chief Justice (1990–1995) and member of the European Court of Human Rights (1992–1998).
Mohammad Momen, 81, Iranian Faqīh and politician.
Sir Rupert Myers, 98, Australian metallurgist and academic, Vice-Chancellor of the University of New South Wales (1969–1981).
Lee Ocran, Ghanaian politician, MP (2005–2009) and Minister for Education (2012–2013).
Alojzy Orszulik, 90, Polish Roman Catholic prelate, Bishop of Łowicz (1992–2004).
Beverley Owen, 81, American actress (The Munsters), ovarian cancer.
Antonia Rey, 92, Cuban-born American actress.
Herlinda Sánchez Laurel, 77, Mexican artist.
Jackie Shane, 78, American singer.
Peter Tork, 77, American musician and actor (The Monkees), complications of adenoid cystic carcinoma.
Lionel Upton, 94, Australian footballer (North Melbourne).
Hilde Zadek, 101, German soprano.

22
Jeff Adachi, 59, American attorney, San Francisco Public Defender (since 2003), heart attack.
Frank Ballance, 77, American politician and convicted criminal, member of the U.S. House of Representatives (2003–2004), North Carolina House (1983–1986) and Senate (1989–2002), complications during surgery.
Victor J. Banis, 82, American author, liver cancer.
Werner Beierwaltes, 87, German philosophy historian.
Aston Cooke, 61, Jamaican dramatist and playwright.
Clark James Gable, 30, American actor and television host (Cheaters), accidental drug overdose.
Joe Goddard, 86, Trinidadian sprinter (1956).
Ron Hooker, 83, English cricketer (Middlesex, Buckinghamshire).
Werner Ipta, 76, German footballer (FC Schalke 04, Bayern Munich, Hertha BSC).
Slobodan Kuljanin, 65, Serbian-Bosnian footballer (Borac Banja Luka).
Josephine Mandamin, 77, Canadian Anishinaabe water activist (Mother Earth Water Walk), pancreatic cancer.
Kodi Ramakrishna, 69, Indian film director (Ankusam, Ammoru, Arundhati), lung infection.
Yadollah Samareh, 82, Iranian linguist.
Jeff Sitar, 57, American locksmith.
Brody Stevens, 48, American comedian and actor (The Hangover, Chelsea Lately, Brody Stevens: Enjoy It!), suicide by hanging.
Sun Wei, 83, Chinese civil engineer, member of the Academy of Engineering (since 2005).
Wang Yening, 92, Chinese physicist, member of the Academy of Sciences (since 1991).
Morgan Woodward, 93, American actor (Cool Hand Luke, The Life and Legend of Wyatt Earp, Dallas), cancer.

23
Bob Adams, 94, Canadian Olympic decathlete.
Marella Agnelli, 91, Italian art collector and socialite.
Roger Ainsworth, 67, British engineer, cancer.
Stan Applebaum, 96, American musician, composer and arranger ("Save the Last Dance for Me", "Stand By Me", "Breaking Up Is Hard to Do").
Ron Avery, 62, American sport shooter, cancer.
Ko Channabasappa, 96, Indian writer.
Douglas, 51, Brazilian-born Swedish scarlet macaw actor (Pippi in the South Seas).
Néstor Espenilla, 60, Filipino banker, Governor of the Bangko Sentral (since 2017), cancer.
Gillian Freeman, 89, British author (The Undergrowth of Literature) and screenwriter (The Leather Boys, That Cold Day in the Park).
Ira Gitler, 90, American jazz historian and journalist.
Brian Halton, 77, British-born New Zealand organic chemist and academic (Victoria University of Wellington).
Katherine Helmond, 89, American actress (Soap, Who's the Boss?, Brazil), Golden Globe winner (1980, 1988), complications from Alzheimer's disease.
Muhammad Tajammal Hussain, 53, Pakistani politician, member of the Provincial Assembly of the Punjab (2002–2018), heart attack.
Natacha Jaitt, 41, Argentinian model, radio and television presenter.
Ann Kendall, 80, British archaeologist.
Johnnie Lovesin, 69, Canadian rock musician.
Dorothy Masuka, 83, Zimbabwean-born South African jazz singer, complications from hypertension.
Carl Meinhold, 92, American basketball player (Providence Steamrollers, Chicago Stags, Scranton Miners).
Jill Morgenthaler, 64, American military officer and politician.
Benny Nielsen, 67, Danish footballer (Næstved, K. Beerschot V.A.C., national team).
Franziska Pigulla, 54, German voice actress.
S. Rajendran, 62, Indian politician, MP (since 2014), traffic collision.
Sebring, 13, Australian racehorse and sire, heart attack.
Andrew Shapter, 52, American film director (Before the Music Dies, Happiness Is, The Teller and the Truth), cancer.
Ricardo J. Vicent Museros, 80, Spanish printer and publisher.
Shmuel Wolf, 85, Israeli actor (An American Hippie in Israel, Fifty-Fifty), multiple system atrophy.
Boris Zhuravlyov, 72, Russian football player (Dynamo Stavropol, Lokomotiv Moscow) and manager (Laos national team).

24
Paul Allaire, 80, American chief executive (Xerox).
Raymond Bellot, 89, French footballer (Toulouse, Monaco, Stade Français).
Paul Blackwell, 64, Australian actor (The Quiet Room, Dr. Plonk, 100 Bloody Acres), cancer.
Ernst-Wolfgang Böckenförde, 88, German legal scholar.
Ole Johs. Brunæs, 83, Norwegian politician, MP (1989–2001).
Philip Cummins, 79, Australian jurist, Supreme Court judge (1988–2009), chair of the Victorian Law Reform Commission (since 2012).
Subodh Das, 71, Indian politician, member of Tripura Legislative Assembly (1977–2018), Panchayet Minister of Tripura Government (1993–2004).
Ian Eliason, 73, New Zealand rugby union player (Taranaki, national team).
Susan J. Ellis, 70, American non-fiction writer, cancer.
Trevor Eyton, 85, Canadian businessman and politician, Senator (1990–2009).
Patricia Garwood, 78, British actress (The Lavender Hill Mob, Petticoat Pirates, No Place Like Home), non-Hodgkin lymphoma.
Antoine Gizenga, 93, Congolese politician, Prime Minister (1960–1961, 2006–2008).
Donald Keene, 96, American-born Japanese historian and writer, heart failure.
T. Jack Lee, 83, American engineer, director of the NASA Marshall Space Flight Center (1989–1994), pancreatic cancer.
Li Xueqin, 85, Chinese historian and palaeographer, Director of the Institute of History, Chinese Academy of Social Sciences.
Carrie Ann Lucas, 47, American disability rights advocate and attorney, complications from septic shock.
Nyandika Maiyoro, 88, Kenyan Olympic long-distance runner (1956, 1960), tuberculosis.
Patrick McCarthy, 67, American fashion magazine publisher and editor (Women's Wear Daily).
Arthur Pardee, 97, American biochemist.
Johnny Romano, 84, American baseball player (Cleveland Indians, Chicago White Sox, St. Louis Cardinals).
Dame Margaret Scott, 96, South African-Australian ballet dancer.
Herbert Stuart, 95, British Anglican priest, RAF Chaplain-in-Chief (1980–1983).
Richard S. Wheeler, 83, American writer and newspaper editor.
Mac Wiseman, 93, American bluegrass musician (Foggy Mountain Boys).
Lothar Zenetti, 93, German theologian and hymnist ("Segne dieses Kind").

25
Janet Asimov, 92, American science fiction writer, psychiatrist, and psychoanalyst.
Chantal duPont, 76, Canadian artist.
Peter Fox, 85, English rugby league player (Batley Bulldogs) and coach (Featherstone Rovers, Bradford Northern).
Fred Gloden, 100, American football player (Philadelphia Eagles, Miami Seahawks).
John Herron, 86, Australian politician and diplomat, Senator (1990–2002), Ambassador to Ireland and the Holy See (2003–2006).
Mark Hollis, 64, English singer-songwriter (Talk Talk).
Roland Leroy, 92, French journalist and politician.
Waldo Machado, 84, Brazilian footballer (Fluminense, Valencia, national team).
Graham Newton, 76, English football player (Walsall, Atlanta Chiefs) and manager (Worcester City).
Paulo Nogueira Neto, 96, Brazilian environmentalist, Secretary of the Environment (1974–1986).
Kathleen O'Malley, 94, American actress (My Old Dutch, Wagon Master).
Kenneth Pitt, 96, British publicist and talent manager (David Bowie).
Nikhil Sen, 87, Bangladeshi dramatist.
Lisa Sheridan, 45, American actress (Invasion, FreakyLinks, Strange Nature), complications from chronic alcoholism.
Oleksandr Tikhonov, 80, Ukrainian pharmacist.
Agnes Ullmann, 91, French biochemist.
Nelson Zeglio, 92, Brazilian footballer (Sochaux, CA Paris, Roubaix-Tourcoing).

26
Andy Anderson, 68, English rock drummer (The Cure, The Glove, Steve Hillage), cancer.
Aytaç Arman, 69, Turkish actor (The Enemy, Night Journey, Hunting Time), cancer.
Christian Bach, 59, Argentine-Mexican actress (Bodas de odio, De pura sangre, El secreto), respiratory failure.
Harry F. Barnes, 86, American senior judge of the District Court for the Western District of Arkansas.
Mickey Channell, 76, American politician, member of the Georgia House of Representatives (1992–2015).
Jayatilleke De Silva, 80, Sri Lankan author and journalist. 
Bobby Doyle, 65, Scottish footballer (Peterborough United, Portsmouth).
Uday Bhanu Hans, 92, Indian poet.
Mitzi Hoag, 86, American actress (We'll Get By).
Tony Honoré, 96, British lawyer and jurist.
Murv Jacob, 74, American artist.
Magnus Lindberg, 66, Swedish musician, cancer.
Charles McCarry, 88, American novelist, complications from cerebral hemorrhage.
Ruge Mutahaba, 49, Tanzanian media executive.
Ivar Nilsson, 85, Swedish Olympic speed skater (1960, 1964).
Grace Quintanilla, 51, Mexican art curator.
Manakkal Rangarajan, 96, Indian classical vocalist.
Dennis Richardson, 69, American politician, member of the Oregon House of Representatives (2003–2015) and Secretary of State (since 2017), brain cancer.
Jeraldine Saunders, 95, American writer and astrologer, creator of The Love Boat, complications from kidney stone surgery.
Thomas L. Shaffer, 84, American legal scholar.
George Stade, 85, American literary scholar and novelist, pneumonia.
Andrejs Žagars, 60, Latvian actor (Ilgais ceļš kāpās, The Life of Klim Samgin, Abduction of the Wizard).

27
Rabindra Prasad Adhikari, 49, Nepalese politician, Minister of Culture, Tourism and Civil Aviation (since 2018), helicopter crash.
César Borda, 25, Argentine footballer (Talleres, UAI Urquiza), suicide by hanging.
Sandra Faire, Canadian television producer (Comedy Now!, The Holmes Show, Video Hits).
Pierrette Fleutiaux, 77, French writer.
Altaf Hussain, 76–77, Bangladeshi cricketer.
Bill Landeryou, 77, Australian politician and trade unionist, member of the Victorian Legislative Council (1976–1992).
António Mendes, 79, Portuguese footballer (Benfica, Vitória de Guimarães, national team).
Jerry Merryman, 86, American electrical engineer, heart and kidney failure.
Milton Morris, 94, Australian politician, NSW MP (1956–1980) and Minister for Transport (1965–1975), complications from a stroke.
Buzwani Mothobi, 80, Zimbabwean diplomat, Ambassador to Japan and Korea, cancer.
Edward Nixon, 88, American business consultant and political campaigner (Richard Nixon 1968 presidential campaign).
Giovanni Piana, 78, Italian philosopher.
Bill Playle, 80, New Zealand cricketer (national team).
Mike Rebhan, 51, American baseball player (Georgia Bulldogs), cancer.
France-Albert René, 83, Seychellois politician, President (1977–2004) and Prime Minister (1976–1977), respiratory failure.
Michel Sainte-Marie, 80, French politician, Mayor of Mérignac (1974–2014) and MP (1973–2012).
Doug Sandom, 89, English drummer (The Who).
Janine Tavernier, 83, Haitian poet and novelist.
Nathaniel Taylor, 80, American actor (Sanford and Son, What's Happening!!, Trouble Man), heart attack.
Willie Williams, 87, American athlete, 100 metres world record holder (1956).

28
Shah Alamgir, 62, Bangladeshi journalist, leukemia.
Zdzisław Antczak, 71, Polish handball player, Olympic bronze medallist (1976).
Lewis Aron, 66, American psychoanalyst.
Xabier Arzalluz, 86, Spanish lawyer and academic, president of PNV (1980–1984, 1987–2004) and Deputy (1977–1980).
María Ignacia Benítez, 60, Chilean politician.
Ed Bickert, 86, Canadian jazz guitarist.
Peter Dolby, 78, English footballer (Shrewsbury Town).
Jim Fritsche, 87, American basketball player (Minneapolis Lakers, Baltimore Bullets, Fort Wayne Pistons).
Joe Girard, 90, American salesman and author, injuries sustained in a fall.
Lou Wills Hildreth, 90, American gospel singer and talent agent.
Sarah Lee Lippincott, 98, American astronomer.
Noel Mulcahy, 89, Irish politician, member of the Seanad Éireann (1977–1981).
Norma Paulus, 85, American lawyer and politician, Oregon Secretary of State (1977–1985), complications from dementia.
André Previn, 89, German-born American composer (Gigi, Elmer Gantry) and conductor (My Fair Lady), Oscar winner (1959, 1960, 1964, 1965).
Stanley Price, 87, British novelist and playwright.
Mervyn J. Rolfe, 71, Scottish politician.
Bruce Rosier, 90, Australian Anglican prelate, Bishop of Willochra (1970–1987).
Ram Lal Singh, 90, Indian politician, MLA (1985–1990) and (1995–2000).
Aron Tager, 84, American actor (Donkey Kong Country, X-Men, Serendipity).
Elliot Griffin Thomas, 92, American Roman Catholic prelate, Bishop of Saint Thomas (1993–1999).

References

2019-02
 02